Thomas P. Mann (born 1965) is a justice of the Supreme Court of Virginia and former circuit court judge of Virginia's 19th Judicial Circuit in Fairfax County. He was elected by the Virginia General Assembly to be a justice of the Supreme Court of Virginia for a 12-year term commencing on August 1, 2022.

Education 

Mann received his Bachelor of Arts in Political Science from New York University in 1987 and his Juris Doctor from the Washington College of Law of American University in 1990.

Legal career 

Mann, rated AV by Martindale-Hubbell, was a lawyer with the law firm of Greenspun & Mann, PC in Fairfax, Virginia.

Judicial career 

Mann served as a juvenile and domestic relations court judge from 2006 to 2016 before being elevated to the circuit court. He was Chief Judge of the Fairfax Juvenile and Domestic Relations District Court from 2010 to 2012. He was elevated to the circuit court in July 2016.

In June 2022, Mann was elected by the Virginia General Assembly to serve as a justice of the Virginia Supreme Court for a 12-year term commencing August 1, 2022.

Mann speaks frequently about domestic violence, attorney ethics, evidence, courtroom etiquette and effective advocacy.

Mann has served the community in a number of capacities including membership on the Fairfax County Domestic Violence Fatality Review Team, the Virginia Sentencing Commission and the Circuit Court Drug Court docket.

Personal life 

In 2015, Mann's daughter, Grace Mann, who was a junior at University of Mary Washington was murdered.

References

External links

1965 births
Living people
20th-century American lawyers
21st-century American judges
Justices of the Supreme Court of Virginia
New York University alumni
Virginia circuit court judges
Virginia lawyers
Washington College of Law alumni